Eugene X. Wozny (1915–1972) was an American college basketball coach. He served as the head basketball coach at Gonzaga University in Spokane, Washington for one season, in 1944–45, compiling a record of 12–19 (.387). Wozny played college basketball at Marquette University, lettering in 1936–37.

References

External links
 

1915 births
1972 deaths
College men's basketball head coaches in the United States
Gonzaga Bulldogs men's basketball coaches
Marquette Golden Eagles men's basketball players